The First Presbyterian Church of Aurora, Indiana is a historic Presbyterian congregation and church located at Aurora, Dearborn County, Indiana. The original building completed in 1855 is still used, and is believed to have been designed by architect John R. Hamilton. It is a two-story, rectangular, Greek Revival style red brick building painted white.  It measure approximately 45 feet wide by 75 feet deep and rests on a rough cut limestone foundation.  It features a steeply tower consisting of a base, belfry, clock, and steeple.

It was listed on the National Register of Historic Places in 1994.  It is located in the Downtown Aurora Historic District.

According to the church's website "a committee of the Presbytery of Madison organized the 'First Presbyterian Church of Aurora, Indiana' in 1844" with members of the Hancock, Gaff, Cannon, Kennedy, Lotham, McConnell, and Witherow families and Rev. W.A. Smith as the first installed pastor.

The church's website states that land was purchased in 1848 and the first phase of construction was completed by 1850 "when the congregation began to meet in what is now the basement of the church".  Second phase construction was completed in 1855. This included the "Greek Revival" sanctuary and bell-tower and "a four-faced" public clock which was "the official time-piece of the City of Aurora until 1981 when it was formally donated to the Congregation by the city council". The church is said to have had the first pipe organ in Dearborn County, installed in the church in 1860 after "a boat transporting the instrument was wrecked at Aurora and the congregation purchased it as 'salvage'." "The pipes were made of wood, and the bellows were pumped by hand."

The congregation is currently in a "yoked" relationship with Hopewell Presbyterian Church of Dillsboro, Indiana,  meaning that the pastor of First Presbyterian also serves as the pastor of Hopewell and that certain administrative and mission functions of both congregations work in close harmony with one another.

References

External links

First Presbyterian Church of Aurora, Indiana website

Churches on the National Register of Historic Places in Indiana
Churches completed in 1855
19th-century Presbyterian church buildings in the United States
Presbyterian churches in Indiana
Presbyterian Church (USA) churches
Greek Revival church buildings in Indiana
Churches in Dearborn County, Indiana
National Register of Historic Places in Dearborn County, Indiana
Historic district contributing properties in Indiana